The Dictionary of Hindu Lore and Legend (2002) is a book written by Anna L. Dallapiccola, and contains information on over one thousand concepts, characters, and places of Hindu mythology and  Hinduism, one of the major religions of the Indian subcontinent. The writer has remained associated with the university of Heidelberg, Germany as a Professor of Indian Art; with the University of Edinburgh, Great Britain as  Honorary Professor; and with De Montfort University, Leicester as a Visiting Professor. She is a Fellow of the Royal Asiatic Society.

Presentation

The dictionary covers a variety of topics including myths and legends of Hinduism, temple architecture, Hindu festivals, Jyotisha and Ayurveda, as also contemporary thoughts pertaining to Hinduism. There are 243 illustrations in the book, facilitating the understanding of the issues involved. The contents of the book are arranged in seven sections as noted below:

Introduction

The section is divided into twelve sub-sections, namely, the land; regional languages and literature; religions of India; the development of Hinduism; sacred literature; pilgrimage; Hindu myths; mythology and art; social structure; and Hinduism abroad. The last sub-section named note on fonts and pronunciation, serves as reference points for the readers.

The introduction section also contains two maps of the Indian subcontinent, almost similar in geographical layout of undivided India. The first map indicates archeological sites; and the current national and state capitals, including and major towns. The second map indicates places of pilgrimage, and mountains.

The dictionary
Hindu is the land of Hinduism

Principal dynasties

Subject index

Chronology

This section covers major events associated with India, Vedic mythology and Vedic civilization, and Hinduism, spanning a period of 5000 years. The chronology recounts the major events, beginning  from 3000 BCE-1700 BCE (the period of the Indus Valley civilization) until 2001 CE, when the celebration of Mahakumbha Mela took place in Allahabad, India, are briefly indicated in the section chronology.

Bibliography

This section contains references to several works and publication, and is further subdivided into six sections, namely, art and iconography; material culture; Hinduisms, Buddhism, Jainism, and Sikhism; history and language; performing art; and primary sources in translation.

Sources of illustrations

Sources

References 

Mythology books
Hindu mythology in popular culture
Hinduism studies books
2002 non-fiction books